Leonard George (Len) Tyler  (15 April 1920 – 21 September 2010) was Archdeacon of Rochdale from 1962 until 1966.

Tyler was educated at Darwen Grammar School; Liverpool University; Christ's College, Cambridge; and Westcott House. He was ordained in 1926.

He was successively
 Chaplain, Trinity College, Kandy
 Principal, Diocesan Divinity School, Colombo
 Rector (ecclesiastical) of Bradford, Manchester
 Vicar of Leigh, Lancashire
 Anglican adviser to ABC Weekend TV 
  Principal, William Temple School

References

1920 births
20th-century English Anglican priests
21st-century English Anglican priests
Alumni of the University of Liverpool
Alumni of Christ's College, Cambridge
Alumni of Westcott House, Cambridge
Archdeacons of Rochdale
2010 deaths
People educated at Darwen Grammar School